Chitose No.4 Dam  is a gravity dam located in Hokkaido Prefecture in Japan. The dam is used for power production. The catchment area of the dam is 294 km2. The dam impounds about 39  ha of land when full and can store 2298 thousand cubic meters of water. The construction of the dam was completed in 1919.

References

Dams in Hokkaido